The Europe/Africa Zone was one of the three zones of the regional Davis Cup competition in 1989.

In the Europe/Africa Zone there were two different tiers, called groups, in which teams competed against each other to advance to the upper tier. The winner in the Europe Zone Group II advanced to the Europe/Africa Zone Group I in 1990.

Participating nations

Draw

  promoted to Group I in 1990.

First round

Luxembourg vs. Malta

Monaco vs. Cyprus

Second round

Belgium vs. Turkey

Luxembourg vs. Norway

Poland vs. Greece

Monaco vs. Bulgaria

Third round

Luxembourg vs. Belgium

Greece vs. Monaco

Fourth round

Greece vs. Belgium

References

External links
Davis Cup official website

Davis Cup Europe/Africa Zone
Europe Zone Group II